Ginigera is a village in the Koppal taluk of Koppal district in the Indian state of Karnataka. Ginigera is on the railway network and lies on the Guntakal–Hubli line.

Demographics
At the 2001 Census of India, Ginigera had a population of 4,968 (2,567 males, 2,402 females) and 954 households.

See also
Hospet
Gangavati, Karnataka
Koppal
Karnataka

References

Villages in Koppal district